Psilorhynchus microphthalmus is a freshwater ray-finned fish, a torrent minnow. It is restricted to the  Chapki Stream in the Chindwin basin of Manipur, India. It is found in flowing water with a rock substrate. This species is threatened from the effects of the use of poisons and explosives for fishing and the sedimentation of its habitat caused by deforestation and slash and burn agriculture.

References 

microphthalmus
Fish described in 1995